Fernando Diniz Silva (born 27 March 1974), known as Fernando Diniz, is a Brazilian professional football coach and former player who played as a midfielder. He is the current head coach of Fluminense.

Diniz is well known for his style of play and involving ball possession. For this reason, he is known to be the manager who consolidated the Tiki-taka style in Brazil, which earned him the nickname of "Brazilian Guardiola".

Playing career
Born in Patos de Minas, Minas Gerais, Diniz started his career with Juventus-SP in 1993. In 1996 he moved to Guarani, but agreed to a contract with Palmeiras shortly after.

In 1997, Diniz moved to Palmeiras' fierce rivals Corinthians, featuring regularly during his two-year spell at the club. He subsequently represented Paraná, Fluminense, Flamengo, Juventude, Cruzeiro and Santos, all in the top tier.

In 2006 Diniz signed for Paulista, and later played for Santo André and Gama. He retired with the latter in 2008, aged 34.

Coaching career
One year after retiring, Diniz was appointed head coach of lowly Votoraty, where he was crowned champions of both Copa Paulista and Campeonato Paulista Série A3. In 2010 he moved to Paulista, club he already represented as a player, and won another Copa Paulista with the side.

On 5 February 2011, Diniz was named Botafogo-SP head coach, but was fired after only four matches in charge. He was appointed at the helm of Atlético Sorocaba in 2012. Despite achieving promotion from the Campeonato Paulista Série A2, he was relieved from his duties in October of that year.

In 2013 Diniz joined Audax, and introduced the tiki-taka, style of FC Barcelona, in the club. On 8 July 2015 he moved to another club he represented as a player, Paraná.

Diniz returned to Audax for the 2016 Campeonato Paulista, which he managed to lead the side to the finals, but lost to Santos. Subsequently, he was appointed head coach of Oeste after a partnership between Oeste and Audax was established.

Diniz returned to Audax for a third spell in 2017, but suffered relegation. He only returned to managerial duties in the following season; after being announced as head coach of Guarani in November 2017, he signed with Atlético Paranaense in January 2018. He was dismissed from the team in June, being subsequently replaced by under-23 trainer Tiago Nunes.

On 19 December 2018, Diniz was appointed head coach of another club he represented as a player, Fluminense. Sacked on 19 August, he took over São Paulo on 27 September.

In the 2020 Série A, Diniz led São Paulo to a streak of 17 matches undefeated from September to December. In January 2021, during a 2–4 loss to Red Bull Bragantino, he had an argument with Tchê Tchê which led to strong media criticism due to his way of speaking to the player.

On 1 February 2021, after seven winless matches, Diniz was sacked. On 6 May, he agreed to a one-year contract with Santos, being officially named head coach the following day.

On 5 September 2021, after six matches without winning, Diniz was sacked by Peixe''. Four days later, he was appointed at Vasco da Gama in the second division, being dismissed on 11 November after failing to achieve promotion.

Diniz returned to Fluminense on 30 April 2022, after Abel Braga resigned.

Career statistics

Coaching statistics

Honours
PlayerPalmeiras Campeonato Paulista: 1996Corinthians Campeonato Paulista: 1997Fluminense Campeonato Carioca: 2002Cruzeiro Campeonato Mineiro: 2004

ManagerVotoraty Copa Paulista: 2009
 Campeonato Paulista Série A3: 2009Paulista Copa Paulista: 2010 Fluminense '''
 Taça Guanabara: 2023

References

1974 births
Living people
Brazilian footballers
Brazilian football managers
Sportspeople from Minas Gerais
Association football midfielders
Campeonato Brasileiro Série A players
Campeonato Brasileiro Série B players
Campeonato Brasileiro Série A managers
Campeonato Brasileiro Série B managers
Clube Atlético Juventus players
Guarani FC players
Sociedade Esportiva Palmeiras players
Sport Club Corinthians Paulista players
Paraná Clube players
Fluminense FC players
CR Flamengo footballers
Esporte Clube Juventude players
Cruzeiro Esporte Clube players
Santos FC players
Paulista Futebol Clube players
Esporte Clube Santo André players
Sociedade Esportiva do Gama players
Botafogo Futebol Clube (SP) managers
Paulista Futebol Clube managers
Clube Atlético Sorocaba managers
Grêmio Osasco Audax Esporte Clube managers
Guaratinguetá Futebol managers
Paraná Clube managers
Oeste Futebol Clube managers
Club Athletico Paranaense managers
Fluminense FC managers
São Paulo FC managers
Santos FC managers
CR Vasco da Gama managers